Luis Ortega may refer to:

 Luis Ortega (film director) (born 1980), Argentine film director and writer
 Luis Felipe Ortega (born 1966), Mexican artist
 Luis Agregado Ortega (born 1937), Filipino politician
 Luis García Ortega, Spanish actor and screenwriter
 Luis Ortega (footballer), a former coach of Hércules CF from 1968 to 1969